R. Venkataraman (date of birth unknown, died 6 August 2020) was an Indian cricketer. He played in three first-class matches for Madhya Pradesh and in two matches for Vidarbha between 1954 and 1963.

References

External links
 

1930s births
Year of birth missing
2020 deaths
Indian cricketers
Madhya Pradesh cricketers
Vidarbha cricketers
Place of birth missing